The Japanese School of Dalian is a Japanese international school in the Dalian Biodiverse Emerging Science and Technology City (Dalian BEST City), in Zhongshan District, Dalian, China.

On May 23, 2000, the Ministry of Education of China approved the establishment of the school. The construction of the current campus was scheduled to finish in early 2013, and the school was scheduled to move to the new campus that year.

See also
 Japanese people in China
Mainland China-aligned Chinese international schools in Japan:
 Kobe Chinese School
 Yokohama Yamate Chinese School

References

Further reading

 Asahida, Kenji (朝日田 顕志 Asahida Kenji; 前大連日本人学校教諭・宮城県矢本町立赤井小学校教諭). "大連日本人学校における国際理解教育の一試み : 現地素材の活用を通して." 在外教育施設における指導実践記録 24, 76–79, 2001. Tokyo Gakugei University. See profile at CiNii.
 Kudou, Shinji (工藤 信司 Kudō Shinji; 前大連日本人学校教諭・北海道白老町立荻野小学校). "大連日本人学校における「総合的な学習の時間」の取り組み : 生活科といかに関連づけ構成していくか." 在外教育施設における指導実践記録 23, 58–61, 2000. Tokyo Gakugei University. See profile at CiNii.

External links
  Japanese School of Dalian
  Japanese School of Dalian (Archive)

Schools in Dalian
Dalian